Kabulov, in feminine form Kabulova, is a Tatar Russian last name and may refer to:

 Akmurad Kabulov, Turkmen major general - see Military of Turkmenistan
 Farmon Kabulov, Uzbek judoka - see 2011 World Judo Championships – Men's 81 kg
 Zamir Kabulov (born 1954), Russian diplomat